The 1976 Amco Cup was the 3rd edition of the NSWRFL Midweek Cup, a NSWRFL-organised national Rugby League tournament between the leading clubs and representative teams from the NSWRFL, the BRL, the CRL, the QRL, the NZRL and the Northern Territory.

A total of 35 teams from across Australia and New Zealand played 34 matches in a straight knock-out format, with the matches being held midweek during the premiership season.

Qualified Teams

Venues

Round 1

Round 2

Round 3

Quarter finals

Semi finals

Final

The final attracted a ground record of 21,670 to Leichhardt Oval. Balmain's second-rower Dennis Tutty was named man-of-the-match.

Awards

Player of the Series
 John Gray (North Sydney)

Golden Try
 Paul Hayward (Newtown)

References

Sources
http://users.hunterlink.net.au/~maajjs/aus/nsw/sum/nsw1976.htm

1976
1976 in Australian rugby league
1976 in New Zealand rugby league